Rudna Glava is a mining site in present-day eastern Serbia that demonstrates one of the earliest evidences of European copper mining and metallurgy, dating to the 5th millennium BC. Shafts were cut into the hillside, with scaffolding constructed for easy access to the veins of ore. It belongs to the Vinča culture, as is shown by pottery-finds. In 1983, Rudna Glava was added to the Archaeological Sites of Exceptional Importance list, protected by Republic of Serbia.

See also
 Archaeological Sites of Exceptional Importance

Sources and external links
 Borislav Jovanović, Rudna Glava, najstarije rudarstvo bakra na centralnom Balkanu. Bor, Muzej rudarstva i metallurgije/Beograd, Arheološki institut 1982.
J. P. Mallory and Martin E. Huld, "Metal", Encyclopedia of Indo-European Culture, Fitzroy Dearborn, 1997.
 http://www.komunikacija.org.rs/komunikacija/casopisi/starinar/XLIX_*ns/d16/document
 Archeology - Archaeometallurgy
 https://web.archive.org/web/20051004092150/http://www.greatorme.freeserve.co.uk/Literature%20Review.htm
 http://www.historyworld.net/wrldhis/PlainTextHistories.asp?historyid=ab16

References

Archaeological sites in Serbia
Copper mines in Serbia
Prehistoric mines
Archaeological Sites of Exceptional Importance
Vinča culture